Mohammad Ishaq is a Jatiya Party (Ershad) politician and the former Member of Parliament of Chittagong-8.

Career
Ishaq was elected to parliament from Chittagong-8 as a Jatiya Party candidate in 1986 and 1988.

References

Jatiya Party (Ershad) politicians
Living people
3rd Jatiya Sangsad members
Year of birth missing (living people)